The 2012 Copa de España de Fútbol Sala was the 23rd staging of the Copa de España de Fútbol Sala. It took place in the Palacio de los Deportes de La Rioja, in Logroño, Spain, between 8 and 11 March 2012. It was hosted by LNFS, La Rioja government & Logroño city council. There was no host team.

Qualified teams
The qualified teams were the eight first teams on standings at midseason.

Venue

Knockout stage

Quarter-finals

Semi-finals

Final

See also
2011–12 Primera División de Futsal
2011–12 Copa del Rey de Futsal

References

External links
Official website
Logroño 2012 official guide
Futsal news at Diario AS
Futsal news at Diario MARCA

Copa de España de Futsal seasons
Espana
Futsal